Shahida Latif is a Pakistani poet, journalist, thinker, and researcher. She is a 2013 Pride of Performance Awards winner for her works. She has three books of poetry in print including her book on Pakistani history, Role of Army in Pakistan.

References

Living people
20th-century births
Pakistani poets
Year of birth missing (living people)
Pakistani women poets
20th-century Pakistani women writers
20th-century Pakistani poets
21st-century Pakistani women writers
21st-century Pakistani poets